Harry Barton (June 17, 1876 – May 9, 1937) was an American architect in North Carolina.

A number of his works are listed on the U.S. National Register of Historic Places (NRHP).

Works include:
Alamance County Courthouse, Elm and Main Sts., Graham, North Carolina (Barton, Harry), NRHP-listed
Alleghany County Courthouse, Main and Whitehead Sts., Sparta, North Carolina (Barton, Harry), NRHP-listed
Buffalo Presbyterian Church and Cemetery, 800 and 803 Sixteenth St., Greensboro, North Carolina (Barton, Harry), NRHP-listed
Cumberland County Courthouse, Franklin, Gillespie, and Russell Sts., Fayetteville, North Carolina (Barton, Harry), NRHP-listed
John Marion Galloway House, 1007 N. Elm St., Greensboro, North Carolina (Barton, Harry M.), NRHP-listed
Guilford County Courthouse, Market St., Greensboro, North Carolina (Barton, Harry), NRHP-listed
Johnston County Courthouse, Martin and 2nd Sts, Smithfield, North Carolina (Barton, Harry), NRHP-listed
Sigmund Sternberger House, 712 Summit Ave., Greensboro, North Carolina (Barton, Harry), NRHP-listed
Surry County Courthouse, N. Main St. between School and Kapp Sts., Dobson, North Carolina (Barton, Harry), NRHP-listed
World War Memorial Stadium, (1926), 510 Yanceyville St., Greensboro, North Carolina (Barton, Harry), NRHP-listed
One or more works in College Hill Historic District, roughly bounded by W. Market St., S. Cedar St., Oakland Ave. and McIver St., Greensboro, North Carolina Barton, Harry), (NRHP-listed
One or more works in Fayetteville Downtown Historic District, roughly along Hay, Person, Green, Gillespie, Bow, Old, W. Russell and Cool Spring Sts., Fayetteville, North Carolina (Barton, Harry), NRHP-listed
One or more works in North Third Avenue Historic District, roughly bounded by N. Second Ave., E. Fourth St., N. Third Ave., and E. Third St., Siler City, North Carolina (Barton, Harry), NRHP-listed
One or more works in Palmer Memorial Institute Historic District, along US 70 W of jct. with NC 3056, Sedalia, North Carolina (Barton, Harry), NRHP-listed
One or more works in Summit Avenue Historic District, Roughly bounded by Chestnut, E. Bessemer, Cypress, Dewey, Park, and Percy Sts. Greensboro, NC (Barton, Harry), NRHP-listed
One or more works in Trinity Historic District, Roughly bounded by Green, Duke, Morgan and W. Main Sts. and Markham Ave., and Clarendon St. Durham, NC (Barton, Harry), NRHP-listed

References

External links 

 Guide to the Harry Barton Architectural Drawings 1923-1924

1876 births
1937 deaths
Architects from North Carolina